The Conduct of Major Maxim is an espionage thriller novel by English author Gavin Lyall, first published in 1982, and the second of his series of novels with the character “Harry Maxim” as the protagonist.

Plot introduction
Former SAS Major Harry Maxim is assigned to Number 10 Downing Street, where he works under George Harbinger, private secretary to the Prime Minister. Maxim is asked by now-retired Sergeant Caswell (who appeared with Maxim in the first scene of The Secret Servant) to assist Corporal Ron Blagg, who has gone AWOL from the British Army after assisting MI6 in a botched undercover operation.

Maxim soon discovers that both MI6 and a shadowy Sovbloc service are looking for Blagg, with deadly consequences. Maxim's efforts to assist Blagg are stymied by a web of deceit and suspicion among the various offices and agencies within the British government, until he uncovers a secret so threatening to one of the new leaders of the German Democratic Republic that they will kill to preserve it. The various settings for most of the action, housing projects in South London, a small rural town in Germany, and a fading port town in Humberside, are described in rich detail.

The growing romance
MI5 liaison Agnes Algar warms to Harry in this book, and provides invaluable professional assistance as an experienced MI-5 agent, but still tries to keep her distance from his domestic life.

Reviews
The Conduct of Major Maxim was the final installment in a series of novels based on a character originally developed for a projected BBC television series.

References

1982 British novels
British spy novels
Novels by Gavin Lyall
Hodder & Stoughton books